Tour of Azerbaijan 2012 is 27th round of Tour of Iran (Azerbaijan) which took place between May 11 till May 16, 2012 in Iranian Azerbaijan. The tour had 6 stage.

Stages of the Tour

Final standing

References

Tour of Azerbaijan (Iran)